The Auburn Journal is a newspaper based in Auburn, California. The newspaper is the flagship of Gold Country Media, a division of Brehm Communications.

Other publications
Gold Country Media also publishes:
Colfax Record, Colfax (weekly)
Auburn Direct (monthly)
Nevada & Placer County Entertainer (monthly)
The Press-Tribune, Roseville (weekly)
The Folsom Telegraph, Folsom (weekly)
Folsom Lake Entertainer (monthly)
The Placer Herald (serving Rocklin), Roseville (weekly)
Lincoln News Messenger, Lincoln (weekly)
Granite Bay View, Roseville (monthly)
The Loomis News, Roseville (weekly)

References

Daily newspapers published in California
Auburn, California